, formerly known as Musashigawa stable, is a stable of sumo wrestlers, part of the Dewanoumi ichimon or group of stables. It was set up in August 1981 by former yokozuna Mienoumi, who branched off from Dewanoumi stable. Since its founding Dewanoumi had a long tradition of not permitting its coaches to break away and form new stables, and Mienoumi was the first to amicably depart Dewanoumi stable since Tochigiyama set up Kasugano stable 62 years earlier. By the early 2000s it had become the strongest stable in sumo, with a yokozuna, three ōzeki and several other top division wrestlers. Wrestlers from the stable won six consecutive tournaments from March 1999 to January 2000. In September 2008 Mienoumi also became head of the Sumo Association.

In September 2010 the former Mienoumi stood down as head coach and passed the stable to former ōzeki Musōyama, who changed its name to Fujishima. Former yokozuna Musashimaru branched off from the stable in April 2013 after taking on the elder name of his former head coach, creating the next generation Musashigawa stable. As of January 2023 Fujishima had 14 wrestlers. It had no sekitori from the demotion of Shōtenrō to the makushita division in March 2016 until the promotion of Bushozan five years later. Bushozan is the second wrestler to reach jūryō since the current head coach took over, following  in 2010.

Ring name conventions
Some wrestlers at this stable take ring names or shikona that include the character 武 (read: bu or mu), meaning war or weapon, which is taken from the first character of the former name of the stable, Musashigawa, and is also the first character in the name of the stable's current owner, former Musōyama. Examples include Bushozan, Mugendai and Musashiumi.

Owners
 2010–present: 18th Fujishima Takehito (iin, former ōzeki Musōyama)
 1981-2010: 14th Musashigawa Akihide (the 57th yokozuna Mienoumi)

Notable active wrestlers

Bushozan (best rank, maegashira 14)

Coaches
 Ōnaruto Takeharu (iin, former ōzeki Dejima)
 Yamawake Takeyoshi (iin, former maegashira Buyūzan)
 Matsuchiyama Takashi (toshiyori, former maegashira Bushūyama)
 Kitajin Sho (toshiyori, former maegashira Shōtenrō)

Notable former wrestlers
 Musashimaru (the 67th yokozuna)
 Dejima (former ōzeki)
 Musōyama (former ōzeki)
 Miyabiyama (former ōzeki)
 Wakanoyama (former komusubi)
 Shōtenrō (former maegashira)

Assistant
 Aranonami (sewanin, former makushita, real name Jirō Takahashi)

Referee
 Kimura Fujinosuke (jonidan gyōji, real name Kōta Hamada)

Hairdresser
 Tokotakeshi (second class tokoyama)

Location and access
Tokyo, Arakawa Ward, Higashi-Nippori 4-27-1
Short walk from Uguisudani Station on Yamanote Line and Keihin-Tohoku Line

See also
 List of sumo stables
 List of active sumo wrestlers
 List of past sumo wrestlers
 Glossary of sumo terms

References

External links 
 Japan Sumo Association profile
 Article on Musashigawa stable

Active sumo stables